This is a list of all (former) Member of the European Parliament for the GreenLeft (GL) and its predecessors
Source:

Seats in the European Parliament

CPN

PPR

PSP

C.P.N. Green Party Netherlands P.P.R. P.S.P.

Rainbow (ppr-psp-cpn-evp-gpn-indep.)

GreenLeft

Alphabetical

Delegation members of the European Parliament (1958-79)

PPR

CPN

Elected members of the European Parliament (from 1979)

CPN

PPR

PSP

GreenLeft 
Current members of the European Parliament are in bold.

European Parliament periods

1958-1979 (Delegation to the European Parliament) 

PPR
Henk Waltmans

CPN
Wessel Hartog

1979-1984 
C.P.N., P.S.P. and P.P.R. participated with separate lists.

CPN 0 Seats 
PPR 0 Seats 
PSP 0 Seats

1984-1989 

C.P.N. Green Party Netherlands P.P.R. P.S.P. common list (aka Green Progressive Accord)
2 Seats:
 Bram van der Lek (PSP) (top candidate)
 Herman Verbeek (PPR)
 Nel van Dijk (CPN)

1989-1994 

Rainbow (ppr-psp-cpn-evp-gpn-indep.) common list 
2 Seats:
 Nel van Dijk (CPN)
 Herman Verbeek (PPR) (top candidate)

1994-1999 

1 Seat:
 Nel van Dijk (top candidate)
 Joost Lagendijk

1999-2004 

4 Seats:
 Theo Bouwman
 Kathalijne Buitenweg
 Joost Lagendijk (top candidate)
 Alexander de Roo

2004-2009 

2 Seats:
 Kathalijne Buitenweg (top candidate)
 Joost Lagendijk

2009-2014 

3 Seats:
 Judith Sargentini (top candidate)
 Bas Eickhout
 Marije Cornelissen

2014-2019 

2 Seats:
 Bas Eickhout (top candidate)
 Judith Sargentini

2019-2024 

3 Seats:
 Bas Eickhout (top candidate)
 Tineke Strik
 Kim van Sparrentak

References

GroenLinks
Main